The Highland Main Line is a railway line in Scotland. Today, services between Inverness and Edinburgh, Glasgow and London use the line. At Inverness the line connects with the Far North Line, the Aberdeen-Inverness Line and services on the Kyle of Lochalsh Line. All trains are diesel-powered.

Much of the Highland Main Line is single track, and trains coming in opposite directions are often timed to arrive at stations at the same time, where crossing loops permit them to pass. Journey times between Inverness and Edinburgh or Glasgow are approximately three and a half hours.

History 

The vast majority of the line was built and operated by the Highland Railway with a small section of the line between Perth and Stanley built by the Scottish Midland Junction Railway, amalgamated with the Aberdeen Railway to become the Scottish North Eastern Railway in 1856, and then absorbed by the Caledonian Railway in 1866. Originally, the line between Inverness and Perth went via Forres, but the Inverness and Aviemore Direct Railway was opened in 1898 to allow for a more direct routeing.

There are two significant summits on the line; Drumochter Summit (also spelled Druimuachdar) (elevation ) between Blair Atholl and Dalwhinnie, and Slochd Summit (elevation ) between Carrbridge and Inverness. Other distinct features on the route include the viaducts at Culloden and Tomatin, the spectacular mountain pass at Drumochter and the severe gradients encountered in both directions, particularly the extended climb from Inverness to the Slochd summit which averages around 1 in 60 the whole way.

Initially the only double track was between Inverness and Daviot and also Stanley Junction and Perth. In the 1890s the single line working was improved with the replacement of telegraphing orders to trains along the line with staff and tablet control instruments. This was later upgraded to automatic token-exchange apparatus. However, the main improvement came with the doubling of sections of line, designed by the engineer Alexander Newlands, beginning with Blair Atholl to Dalnacardoch in 1900, extended to Druimuachdar in 1901 and Dalwhinnie in 1909. In the 1960s, many sections of the line were converted from double track to single track. In 1976, 23 miles from Blair Athol to Dalwhinie was redoubled. In March 2019 Network Rail completed a programme of works to increase capacity on the line and support the introduction of InterCity 125 sets on ScotRail services with passing loops and platforms extended.

Stations and services 
As of 2020, there are stations on the line as follows:

Services on the line are provided by ScotRail and London North Eastern Railway. The London North Eastern Railway service is titled the Highland Chieftain, which departs Inverness at 08:00 and runs to London King's Cross via the East Coast Main Line, arriving in London at 16:00. The return working leaves London at 12:00 and reaches Inverness at 20:00.

The Caledonian Sleeper travels overnight between Inverness and London Euston via the West Coast Main Line. This joins portions from Aberdeen and Fort William at Edinburgh Waverley and south of there forms the longest locomotive-hauled passenger train in the United Kingdom with 16 coaches.

All trains between Perth and Inverness call at Pitlochry, Kingussie and Aviemore. Most ScotRail services call at Dunkeld & Birnam(8 north and 10 south) and at Blair Atholl(8 north and 6 south), with the stations at Dalwhinnie(5 each way), Newtonmore and Carrbridge being served less often. On Sundays, a couple of services continue through to Elgin, calling at Nairn and Forres.

Rolling stock

Usage
Station usage at some stations remain stable. Overall usage on the line comparing April 2003 to April 2010 has increased 154%.

Future 
In the Scottish Government's National Transport Strategy, published in February 2020, it was stated that the line would be electrified with overhead lines by 2035.

References

External links 
Route on OpenStreetMap
Highland Main Line on Transport Scotland
Highland Mainline Community Rail Partnership

Transport in Perth and Kinross
Transport in Highland (council area)
Railway lines in Scotland
Standard gauge railways in Scotland